E119 may refer to: 

 Ununennium, element 119, a predicted chemical element that has not yet been observed
 European route E119, a road in Russia and Azerbaijan
 E119, a former document type that was replaced by the European Health Insurance Card